The Tamga is a river in Jeti-Ögüz District of Issyk-Kul Region of Kyrgyzstan. It rises on north slopes of Teskey Ala-Too Range and flows into the lake Issyk-Kul. The river is mainly fed by ice and snow meltwater and precipitation. The maximum flow is in July-August and the minimum in January. The river is used for irrigation. Settlement Tamga is located near the river.

References

Rivers of Kyrgyzstan
Tributaries of Issyk-Kul